Hattie Mae Winston (born March 3, 1945) is an American film, television and Broadway actress. She is known for her roles as Margaret Wyborn on Becker, Lucy Carmichael in Rugrats, The Rugrats Movie, and the spin off series All Grown Up! and as a cast member of the PBS children's series The Electric Company.

Early life
Winston was born in Lexington, Mississippi on March 3, 1945, the daughter of Roosevelt Winston and Selena (née Thurmond). She was raised in Greenville, Mississippi, where Winston attended local schools, which were segregated at the time. She left the South at the age of 14 and settled in Manhattan, New York, graduating high school there. Winston attended Howard University for two years, where she majored in music.

Career

Broadway and stage
She began her career on stage in New York City in 1965, and was an original member of the Negro Ensemble Company. By the late 1960s, she had begun acting on Broadway. Winston portrayed Nell in musical The Me Nobody Knows (1970−71) before landing the role of Sylvia in Shakespearean comedy The Two Gentlemen of Verona (1972−73), replacing Jonelle Allen. She had previously served as Allen's understudy in the production. Winston then appeared as Cleo in musical I Love My Wife (1979), with Lawrence Hilton-Jacobs playing her character's husband. 

Winston portrayed the lead, Billie Holiday, in play Lady Day (1981). She starred in the Broadway hit The Tap Dance Kid (1983−84) as Ginnie, her latest Broadway production to date. Winston received two Obie Awards for her roles in Mother Courage and Her Children and The Michigan. She co-wrote the musical Nativity: A Life Story alongside James Stovall, which has been performed frequently since its inception.

The Electric Company
In 1973, Winston joined the cast of PBS children's series The Electric Company during its third season, produced by the Children's Television Workshop. She replaced Lee Chamberlin on the series after Chamberlin’s departure at the end of the show’s second season in 1973. Winston's most notable character was Valerie the Librarian, the girlfriend of Easy Reader (portrayed by Morgan Freeman). She also played many villainess roles versus Spider-Man on the Spidey Super Stories sketches, such as the Fox, the Thumper, the Queen Bee, and the Queen of Diamonds. Winston remained with the show until it ended in 1977.

Film and television
While appearing on The Electric Company, Winston was Veronique on soap opera The Edge of Night (1976). Winston appeared regularly as nurse Toni Gillette in Nurse from 1981 to 1982. She performed alongside Dorian Harewood in the television film The Hope Division (1987). Winston was Pauline in the unsuccessful pilot Coming to America (1989), based on the movie of the same name. In 1990, Winston portrayed Nurse Flowers in Sesame Street Home Video Visits the Hospital.

In 1991, she won the role of housekeeper Gloria Davis in Homefront, and continued playing the character until 1993. For her work on Homefront, Winston was nominated for an NAACP Image Award for Outstanding Actress in a Drama Series in 1994. She recurred on soap opera Port Charles as Alice Morgan, and acted in the Western The Cherokee Kid (1996).

She provided the voice of Lucy Carmichael on the popular Nickelodeon cartoon Rugrats, as well as in the 1998 film version, The Rugrats Movie. Winston reprised the role in the spin-off series All Grown Up!, which ran from 2003 through 2008. During the 2000s, she played Margaret Turk, the mother of Dr. Christopher Turk (Donald Faison), on the NBC (later ABC) sitcom Scrubs. 

From 1998 through 2004, she portrayed nurse Margaret Wybourn on the CBS sitcom Becker, starring Ted Danson. John Crook described Winston as a "valuable cog" on Becker. In 2001, Winston received her second NAACP Image Award nomination, in the category of Outstanding Supporting Actress in a Comedy Series as Margaret.

Following her run on Becker, Winston made guest appearances on ER, Cold Case, Castle and Mike & Molly. She had a recurring role as Sister Coriann Pearly in sitcom The Soul Man.

In film, Winston portrayed Mrs. Todd in Beverly Hills Cop III (1994), Simone in Jackie Brown (1997) and Angela Russel in True Crime (1999), the latter opposite Clint Eastwood. Winston had a minor role as a hospital nurse in Living Out Loud (1998).

Personal life
Winston is married to Harold Wheeler, who served as musical director for Dancing with the Stars. The couple have one daughter, Samantha.

Filmography

References

External links
 
 
 

1945 births
Living people
Actresses from Mississippi
African-American actresses
American sketch comedians
American stage actresses
American television actresses
American voice actresses
People from Lexington, Mississippi
21st-century African-American people
20th-century African-American women
21st-century African-American women
20th-century American actresses
21st-century American actresses